Big Marsh Creek is a  tributary of Crescent Creek in Klamath County, in the U.S. state of Oregon. The creek flows generally north from its source upstream of Big Marsh, south of Crescent Lake on the eastern side of the Cascade Range.

The upper reaches of Big Marsh Creek flow through the Oregon Cascades National Recreation Area.

See also
 List of rivers of Oregon

References

Rivers of Klamath County, Oregon
Rivers of Oregon
Wild and Scenic Rivers of the United States